Harrisoniascincus zia is also known as the rainforest cool-skink or beech skink. It is monotypic in the genus Harrisoniascincus. It is endemic to Australia.

References

Skinks
Lizard genera
Taxa named by Richard Walter Wells
Taxa named by Cliff Ross Wellington
Monotypic lizard genera